The 2016–17 OGC Nice season was the 112th professional season of the club since its creation in 1904.

Players

Squad information
Players and squad numbers last updated on 20 August 2016.Note: Flags indicate national team as has been defined under FIFA eligibility rules. Players may hold more than one non-FIFA nationality.

Transfers

In

Out

Pre-season and friendlies
Pre-season preparations began on 29 June, with new manager Lucien Favre taking charge. The first ten days were spent in Fontenay-le-Comte before moving to Divonne-les-Bains, where they played their first friendly against Servette. Following the match, the team moved to Nice for the remainder of the pre-season.

Competitions

Overall

Ligue 1

League table

Results summary

Results by round

Matches

Coupe de France

Coupe de la Ligue

UEFA Europa League

Group stage

Statistics

Appearances and goals

|-
! colspan=14 style=background:#dcdcdc; text-align:center| Goalkeepers

|-
! colspan=14 style=background:#dcdcdc; text-align:center| Defenders

|-
! colspan=14 style=background:#dcdcdc; text-align:center| Midfielders

|-
! colspan=14 style=background:#dcdcdc; text-align:center| Forwards

|-
! colspan=14 style=background:#dcdcdc; text-align:center| Players transferred out during the season

Goalscorers

Last updated: 8 June 2017

Clean sheets

Last updated: 14 October 2016

Disciplinary record

References

Nice
OGC Nice seasons